The World Benchrest Shooting Federation (WBSF) is the international governing body for benchrest shooting, with disciplines for both centerfire and rimfire ammunition. WBSF was formed in 2001.

Disciplines

Rimfire 
 50 m or 
 Teams (3 shooters, with 6 targets each)
 Individual (6 targets)

Two Gun 
 Teams
 Individual

Light Varmint (LV) 
 Small Group 100 m (or )
 Small Group 200 m (or )
 100 m aggregate (or )
 200 m aggregate (or )
 Grand Aggregate

Heavy Varmint (HV) 
 Small Group 100 m (or )
 Small Group 200 m (or )
 Small Group 300 m (or )
 100 m aggregate (or )
 200 m aggregate (or )
 300 m aggregate (or )
 Grand Aggregate
 Small Group 200 m x10 Shots (or )
 200 m x10 Shots Aggregate (or )

Targets 
WBSF Rimfire Target
The 10 ring has a diameter of 3 mm (0.12 inches), which is 0.06 mrad at 50 meters.
The inner ten ring has a diameter of 1 mm (0.04 inches), 0.02 mrad at 50 meters.

Records

World Records 
Official records of the World Benchrest Shooting Federation

Rimfire -  Stephane Gomel (France) 250 - 25X (WBSF World Championship Manresa 2018 Spain)

European Records 
Below are the official records of the European Benchrest Shooting Federation (EBSF) as of February 2017.

Aggregates

Grand Aggregates

Small Groups

See also 
 List of shooting sports organizations
 World Rimfire and Air Rifle Benchrest Federation

References

External links 
 The official web page of World Benchrest Shooting Federation
 WBSF Centrefire Competition Rulebook
 WBSF Rimfire Competition Rulebook
 http://www.benchrest-forum.com European benchrest Forum

Shooting sports organizations
Rifle shooting sports